Yukon Gold is a large cultivar of potato most distinctly characterized by its thin, smooth, eye-free skin and yellow-tinged flesh. This potato was developed in the 1960s by Garnet ("Gary") Johnston in Guelph, Ontario, Canada, with the help of Geoff Rowberry at the University of Guelph. The official cross bred strain was made in 1966 and 'Yukon Gold' was finally released into the market in 1980.

Development and naming 

In the 1900s, many Dutch and Belgian immigrants began settling in the "Banana Belt" region of southern Ontario.  Many of these immigrants began vegetable farming around the towns of Simcoe, Leamington, and Harrow along the shore of Lake Erie. In the 1950s, the vegetable growers of this region began petitioning for the breeding rights and licensing for a yellow-fleshed potato like ones they were used to growing in Europe. For Gary Johnston, this began the nearly 30-year development of the 'Yukon Gold' potato.

In 1953, Johnston was a lab technician in the potato development laboratory at the Ontario Agriculture College and he led a team that cross-bred two varieties to create the new type. In Lima, this cultivar is considered a delicacy for its bright colour and distinct flavour. After trying these Peruvian potatoes, Johnston set out to breed a potato with the same colour and flavor characteristics, but larger in size and with a smoother shape, similar to the potatoes being grown in that part of Southwestern Ontario. In 1966, the development team made their first cross between a W5289-4 (2× cross between 'Yema de huevo' and 2× Katahdin) and a 'Norgleam' potato native to North Dakota. After the 66th cross that year, a true-breeding seed was produced, and the G6666 was created.

The early name for the new cultivar was "Yukon", for the Yukon River involved in the Klondike Gold Rush in Northern Canada. Charlie Bishop, or Walter Shy according to some sources, suggested adding "Gold" to describe the colour and appearance. "It was a revolutionary concept ... He was a pioneer. He [Johnston] had the vision for yellow-fleshed potatoes", said Hielke De Jong, a potato breeder with Agriculture and Agri-Food Canada. Johnston also developed and brought 15 other potato varieties to market while at the Ontario Agriculture College lab, where he had been seconded by his employer, Agriculture Canada.  

A University publication states that "Yukon Gold was the first Canadian-bred potato variety to be promoted, packaged and marketed with its name right on the pack".

In spite of the overwhelming success of this potato for some years, sales in Canada dropped 30% between 2004 and 2014 as other varieties became increasingly popular.

Cooking 
'Yukon Gold' potatoes are generally considered all-purpose "jack-of-all-trades" potatoes; unlike some other cultivars, they can stand up to both dry-heat and wet-heat cooking methods, though rarely the ideal potato for a specific purpose. Its waxy moist flesh and sweet flavour make it ideal for boiling, baking and frying but these potatoes will also withstand grilling, pan frying, and roasting.

One medium (150g) potato provides the following nutrition (percentages are based on a 2,000-calorie diet):
Calories 	110	
Fat		0 g	
Sodium	10 mg
Potassium	770 mg
Total Carbs	26 g (9%)
Dietary Fibre	2 g (8%)
Sugars	        3 g
Protein  	3 g
Cholesterol	0 mg		
Vitamin A	0%	
Vitamin C	50%
Calcium   	2%
Iron	        15%

Agriculture and growing

General features 
 Bred from Norgleam × W5279-4 cross at the University of Guelph, registered in 1980.
 Plant maturity reached at mid-season.

Botanical features 
 Leaves are olive green, moderately skinny and open away from stem.
 Flowers are light violet with a star of yellow-green at the base becoming light violet towards the edges.
 Buds range from light green to purplish green.
 Tubers (potatoes) are oval with a slightly flattened shape and with smooth contours and shallow eyes.
 Skin appears light yellow to light golden brown and is flaked with yellow.
 Flesh is yellow in colour and has high moisture content.
 Sprouts are reddish purple.

Agricultural features 
 Medium to high yield.
 Large tubers are slightly susceptible to hollow heart (hollowed out centre of potato)
 Excellent storage characteristics due to long dormancy phase; best to store in a cold dark place.

Susceptibility to disease 
Very susceptible to:  seed decay, blackleg, early blight, late blight, early dying, PVY, soft rot, dry rot, leak, pink rot, silver scurf, and black scurf.

Susceptible to:  common scab.

Moderately tolerant to:  leaf roll.

Tolerant to:  PVX.

Storage 
This cultivar is resistant to bruising and does not sprout a lot because it has good dormancy. If tubers are stored correctly they will not lose a lot of moisture compared to other cultivars. It is important that the lenticels are not swollen and that the skin is not bruised because this can lead to major rot issues.

See also 

Creamer potato

References

External links
 Yukon Gold Characteristics
 Yukon Gold Information Page
 Yukon Gold Potato Research Program History
 Canadian Food Inspection Agency: Yukon Gold
 #826a21 Hex Color - Yukon Gold - Color Hex Map

Potato cultivars